Duniq may refer to:

 Duniq, Iran, a village in Iran
 Duniq, Syria, a village in Aleppo Governorate, Syria